Soulmary is a village in Chirang district of Assam state of India.

References

Villages in Chirang district